Hallavar is a village in the municipality of Qumlaq in the Oghuz Rayon of Azerbaijan.

References

Populated places in Oghuz District